Richard T. Cooney (October 25, 1933 – November 27, 2014) was an American businessman and politician.

Born in Cranston, Rhode Island, Cooney served in the United States Army. He then received his bachelor's degree from University of Rhode Island and his masters from Northwestern University. He worked for Bell Laboratories and lived in Salem, New Hampshire. He served in the New Hampshire House of Representatives, from 1996 to 2006, and was a Republican. He died in Salem, New Hampshire.

Notes

1933 births
2014 deaths
Politicians from Cranston, Rhode Island
People from Salem, New Hampshire
Northwestern University alumni
University of Rhode Island alumni
Businesspeople from New Hampshire
Republican Party members of the New Hampshire House of Representatives
20th-century American businesspeople